Grant Township is one of fifteen townships in Greene County, Indiana, USA.  As of the 2010 census, its population was 739.

Geography
The stream of Buck Creek runs through this township.

Cities and towns
 Switz City (west three-quarters)

Adjacent townships
 Smith Township (north)
 Fairplay Township (east)
 Washington Township (southeast)
 Stafford Township (southwest)
 Stockton Township (west)
 Wright Township (northwest)

Cemeteries
The township contains three cemeteries: Buzan, Switz City and Waggoner.

Major highways

References
 
 United States Census Bureau cartographic boundary files

External links
 Indiana Township Association
 United Township Association of Indiana

Townships in Greene County, Indiana
Bloomington metropolitan area, Indiana
Townships in Indiana